George de la Rey Tossel (born 5 March 1988 in Pretoria, South Africa) is a South African rugby union player, currently playing with Western Province Super League club side Hamiltons. He usually plays as a centre, but can also play as a winger or a fullback.

Career

Youth and amateur rugby

After playing schoolboy rugby at Middelburg Technical High School, Tossel was included in the  squad for the 2006 Under-18 Craven Week tournament. He moved to Durban, where he joined the  Academy. For the 2008–2009 season, Tossel had a spell at English North 1 West side West Park St Helens before returning to Durban.

In 2011, he made appearances for  during the 2011 Varsity Cup competition.

Leopards

2011 saw Tossel join Potchefstroom-based side . He made his first class debut for them in their 2011 Vodacom Cup match against . He also made his Currie Cup debut in the same season, making twelve appearances in a disappointing campaign that saw the Leopards being relegated to the First Division.

A return to regular rugby saw Tossel contribute four tries in 21 appearances during the 2013 Vodacom Cup and Currie Cup seasons.

In 2014, Tossel scored nine tries in just seven matches in the 2014 Vodacom Cup competition to finish as the joint-leading try-scorer for the competition.

References

South African rugby union players
Living people
1988 births
Rugby union players from Pretoria
Rugby union centres
Rugby union fullbacks
Rugby union fly-halves
Leopards (rugby union) players